Bring Me the Horizon (often abbreviated as BMTH) are  a British rock band, formed in Sheffield in 2004. The group currently consists of lead vocalist Oliver Sykes, guitarist Lee Malia, bassist Matt Kean, drummer Matt Nicholls and keyboardist Jordan Fish. They are signed to RCA Records globally and Columbia Records exclusively in the United States.

The band released their debut album Count Your Blessings in 2006. Upon release, the album's deathcore sound polarised listeners, and was largely met with critical disdain. The band began to break away from this sound with their second album Suicide Season (2008), which was considered a creative, critical and commercial turning point for the band. Bring Me the Horizon released their third album, There Is a Hell Believe Me I've Seen It. There Is a Heaven Let's Keep It a Secret., in 2010, propelling them to greater international fame, whilst incorporating influences from classical music, electronica and pop. Their major label debut, Sempiternal, (2013) achieved Gold certification in Australia (35,000) and Silver in the United Kingdom (60,000). That's the Spirit (2015) debuted at number two in the UK Albums Chart and the US Billboard 200. Their sixth studio album Amo (2019) became their first UK chart-topper. The same year, the band also put out the commercial release, Music to Listen To... (2019). The following year, the band released Post Human: Survival Horror (2020), the first in a planned series of four projects under the Post Human name. The band have also released two extended plays and two live albums. They have received four Kerrang! Awards, including two for Best British Band and one for Best Live Band, and have been nominated for two Grammy Awards. The band has sold over 4 million records worldwide, and have topped the UK Rock & Metal Singles Chart with songs such as "Throne", "Drown, "Mantra" and "Parasite Eve".

The style of their early work, including their debut album Count Your Blessings, has been described primarily as deathcore, but over the course of several albums, the band has shifted its style and moved in a more melodically-oriented direction by combining their approach to metalcore with elements of electronica, pop and hip hop.

History

Formation and early releases (2002–2006)

Bring Me the Horizon's founding members came from diverse musical backgrounds within metal and rock. Matt Nicholls and Oliver Sykes had a common interest in American metalcore such as Norma Jean and Skycamefalling, and used to attend local hardcore punk shows. They later met Lee Malia, who spoke with them about thrash metal and melodic death metal bands like Metallica and At the Gates; Malia had also been part of a Metallica tribute band before meeting the pair. Bring Me the Horizon officially formed in March 2004, when the members were aged 15 to 17. Curtis Ward, who also lived in the Rotherham area, joined Sykes, Malia and Nicholls on drums. Bassist Matt Kean, who was in other local bands, completed the line-up. Their name is paraphrased from a line of dialogue spoken by Captain Jack Sparrow in the 2003 film Pirates of the Caribbean: The Curse of the Black Pearl, where Captain Jack Sparrow says: "Now, bring me that horizon."

In the months following their formation, Bring Me the Horizon created a demo album titled Bedroom Sessions. They followed this by releasing their first EP, This Is What the Edge of Your Seat Was Made For, in September 2004 through local UK label Thirty Days of Night Records. Bring Me the Horizon were the label's first signing. It was recorded at Pristine Studios in Nottingham over the course of two weekends, with drums and bass guitar laid down over the first weekend, and guitars and vocals completed a week later.

UK label Visible Noise noticed the band after the release of their EP, and signed them for a four-album deal, in addition to re-releasing the EP in January 2005. The re-release gained the band significant attention, eventually peaking at No. 41 on the UK album charts. The band was later awarded Best British Newcomer at the 2006 Kerrang! Awards ceremony.

The band's first tour was supporting The Red Chord across the United Kingdom. As with other early tours, they were able to get this slot by tricking venue promoters. Kean and Oliver's mother Carol Sykes were the de facto managers of the band at this time, a role they continued to occupy until 2008. For The Red Chord support, Kean emailed promoters and pretended they were opening on all the dates, when they were supposed to play only at their local show. This led them to being booked for the whole tour. In another case, Sykes created an e-mail account in the name of Johnny Truant vocalist Oliver Mitchell, which he used to contact a promoter requesting Bring Me the Horizon on their tour. Alcohol consumption fuelled their live performances in their early history when the band would get so drunk they vomited on stage and damaged their equipment.

Count Your Blessings (2006–2007)

The band released their debut album Count Your Blessings in October 2006 in the United Kingdom and in August 2007 in the United States. They rented a house in the country to write songs, but easily became distracted. They then recorded the album in inner-city Birmingham, a process which was infamous for their excessive and dangerous drinking. During this period drummer Nicholls summarised it saying "we were out every night, just being regular 18-year-olds". Critics panned the album adding to the strongly polarised responses the band were already seeing from the public.

They supported Count Your Blessings by going on a lengthy headline tour of the UK in November, and immediately followed this joining Lostprophets and The Blackout on a UK tour through late November and December 2006.

In January 2007, Bring Me the Horizon were able to set their sights beyond the UK, when they replaced Bury Your Dead on Killswitch Engage's European headline tour. The slot became available after Bury Your Dead were forced to withdraw by the departure from the band of their vocalist, Mat Bruso. Bring Me the Horizon's presence on the tour was poorly received by fans of Killswitch Engage, with concert attendees regularly throwing bottles at the band before they even started playing their set.

Suicide Season and Ward's departure (2008–2009)

Bring Me the Horizon recorded their second studio album, Suicide Season, in Sweden with producer Fredrik Nordström. He was unimpressed with their first album and was initially absent from the recording sessions unless he needed to be there. Nordström later heard the new sound they were experimenting with during a recording session and became very involved in the record. It was promoted virally in the weeks before its release with the promotional tag line "September is Suicide Season." To promote Suicide Season the band embarked on their first headline tour of the United States, as well as appearing at the 2008 Warped Tour. In May 2008, Bring Me the Horizon was the main supporting band on I Killed the Prom Queen's farewell Australian tour with The Ghost Inside and The Red Shore.

Suicide Season was released on 18 September 2008 in the United States on Epitaph and on 29 September in Europe through Visible Noise. In 2009, Bring Me the Horizon attended the 2009 Kerrang! Tour alongside Black Tide, Dir En Grey, In Case of Fire and Mindless Self Indulgence. They also joined Thursday, Cancer Bats, Four Year Strong and Pierce the Veil on the North American leg of the 2009 Taste of Chaos tour from February to April after the tour's organizer Kevin Lyman offered them the slot. The band were initially hesitant to join this tour, but were convinced after Lyman offered them a bus and $500 of fuel for the tour.

During the Taste of Chaos tour in March of that year, guitarist Curtis Ward left the band. His relationship with the band had deteriorated as his stage performances were poor. He was abusive to audiences during the Taste of Chaos tour, and had contributed little to the writing of Suicide Season. Another reason for his departure was the worsening tinnitus in his one functioning ear. Ward was born deaf in one ear and admitted playing in the band worsened the ringing in his other ear to such a degree that he was unable to sleep at night. Ward offered to perform the rest of the tour dates, which the band rejected and instead asked their guitar technician, Dean Rowbotham, to substitute for him for the remaining performances. Lee Malia noted that Ward's departure helped improve everyone's mood as he had been very negative. Within a week of the tour finishing, Sykes began talking to Jona Weinhofen, at the time the guitarist of Bleeding Through. The band knew of him from his work with his former band I Killed the Prom Queen, and he was asked to join them. Ward has since worked on the TV show Top Gear, and has occasionally performed on stage with Bring Me The Horizon, playing "Pray For Plagues", most notably at Wembley Arena in 2015. In 2016, it was announced that Ward had joined the band Counting Days.

In November 2009, Bring Me the Horizon released a remixed version of Suicide Season, titled Suicide Season: Cut Up! Musicians and producers featured on the album include: Ben Weinman, Skrillex, L'Amour La Morgue, Utah Saints and Shawn Crahan. Musically, the album incorporates many genres including: electronica, drum and bass, hip-hop and dubstep. The dubstep style of the record has been acknowledged in tracks by Tek-One and Skrillex while the hip-hop elements are found in Travis McCoy's remix of "Chelsea Smile".

There Is a Hell... (2010–2011)

The band's third album, and first with their new rhythm guitarist Jona Weinhofen, titled There Is a Hell Believe Me I've Seen It. There Is a Heaven Let's Keep It a Secret., was released on 4 October 2010 and debuted at number 17 on the Billboard 200 in the United States, number 13 on the UK Album Chart, and number one on the Australian Albums Chart, the UK Rock Chart and the UK Indie Chart. Despite reaching number one in Australia, the album's sales were the lowest for a number one album in the history of the Australian Recording Industry Association (ARIA) charts.

Matt Nicholls describes the lyrical themes of There Is a Hell... as being "repercussions of everything we were singing about on our last CD [Suicide Season]," calling the music and lyrics a lot moodier and darker. Five singles  were released from the album including: "It Never Ends", "Anthem", "Blessed with a Curse", "Visions", and "Alligator Blood", with music videos produced for each of the songs. The band embarked on a headline tour in intimate venues across the United Kingdom with support from Cancer Bats and Tek-One. In December 2010, Bring Me the Horizon joined Bullet for My Valentine as the main support band, alongside Atreyu, on a short five-date arena tour around the United Kingdom. To cope with high demand, Live Nation released extra standing tickets for all dates.

In April 2011, Bring Me the Horizon embarked on a European tour, starting in the United Kingdom. They toured with Parkway Drive and Architects as main support bands, with The Devil Wears Prada as the opening support for the UK and dubstep group Tek-One. The tour, however, was not without its hindrances. On 28 April, Nicholls broke his arm whilst playing football with members of Bring Me the Horizon, Parkway Drive and Architects. Instead of cancelling the tour, Architects' drummer Dan Searle filled in as drummer, but this meant that Bring Me the Horizon's setlist was halved in length. The tour was extended with a North American leg from 13 August to 4 October, retaining Parkway Drive and Architects and adding Deez Nuts to the line up. On 23 August they released the fourth music video and single, "Visions", and on 31 October the music video for the song "Alligator Blood" was released.

In December 2011, Machine Head completed an arena tour across Europe with Bring Me the Horizon as the main support band along with DevilDriver and Darkest Hour. Oliver Sykes said these would be the last European dates before they began writing and the recording their fourth album. 2011 ended with an announcement by the band on 29 December of a new extended play titled The Chill Out Sessions, a collaborative effort with British DJ Draper. Draper first released an "officially sanctioned" remix of the song "Blessed with a Curse" in May 2011. The EP was originally supposed to be released in time for New Year's Day, and made available for download and purchase though Bring Me the Horizon's website, but the EP's release was cancelled due to the band's "current management and label situation".

Sempiternal and Weinhofen's departure (2012–2014)

After an intense touring schedule, Bring Me the Horizon finally completed their third album's promotion at the end of 2011. They returned to the UK for an extended break and eventually starting work on their next album. Much like their previous two albums, they wrote their fourth album in seclusion and isolation to stay focused. This time, they retreated to a house in the Lake District. In July, the band started to publish images of themselves recording at a 'Top Secret Studio Location,' and revealed they were working with producer Terry Date for the recording and production of the album. On 30 July, the band announced they had left their label and signed with RCA, who would release their fourth album in 2013. The band played only three shows in all of 2012: Warped Tour 2012 on 10 November at the Alexandra Palace in London, which they headlined, (and was initially believed to be their only show), the BBC Radio 1's Radio 1 Rocks show on 22 October, where they played a six-song set supporting Bullet for My Valentine, and at a warm-up show for Warped Tour in Sheffield on 9 November. In late October it was announced that the fourth album would be called Sempiternal with a tentative release in early 2013. On 22 November the band released the Draper collaborative album The Chill Out Sessions free of charge.

On 4 January 2013, Bring Me the Horizon released the first single from Sempiternal, "Shadow Moses". It was first played by radio presenter Daniel P. Carter on BBC's Radio 1. Due to popular demand, Epitaph released the music video for the song a week earlier than planned. In January, the band also saw a change in their line up. This began early in the month when Jordan Fish, Worship keyboardist and session musician for the band during the writing of Sempiternal, was announced as a full member. Then later in the month, Jona Weinhofen left the band for undisclosed reasons. Despite the band denying speculation that Fish replaced Weinhofen, reviewers said that replacing a guitarist with a keyboardist better fit their style.

The band was confirmed for several festival appearances in February. They played the Australian Soundwave festival, performing at all five dates in: Brisbane, Sydney, Melbourne, Adelaide and Perth, and then at RAMFest in South Africa with Rise Against in March, Rock Am Ring and Rock im Park festivals in Germany in June, and from June until August they played Warped Tour 2013 in the U.S. and Canada. To coincide with 29 April release of Sempiternal the band made their first headline tour of the United Kingdom in 18 months with Crossfaith and Empress AD.

In support of Sempiternal, the band toured Australia with Of Mice & Men and Crossfaith, and played a British tour with Pierce The Veil and Sights & Sounds. They then completed the American Dream Tour in North America, supported by Of Mice & Men, Issues, letlive. and Northlane. The band was announced as the main supporter for American band A Day to Remember on their "Parks & Devastation Tour" across America throughout September and October, along with support acts Motionless in White and Chiodos. The band performed at Wembley Arena in London on 5 December with support acts Young Guns, Issues and Sleepwave, which was recorded and released as a live album/DVD.

Later in 2014, the band released two new tracks titled "Drown" on 21 October, as a stand-alone single, and "Don't Look Down" on 29 October, as part of the re-score of Drive.

That's the Spirit (2015–2017)

In late June, the band began to promote pictures of an umbrella symbol being used as a tattoo, and on stickers, and posters across England, the United States, Australia, and Europe; it was later used for a promotional cover for the band's first single. The band released a short video in early July where the words "that's the spirit" could be heard in reverse.  On 13 July 2015, the promotional single "Happy Song" was released on the band's Vevo page, and on 21 July 2015, Sykes revealed the album's name was That's the Spirit. The band released the single and music video for "Throne" on 23 July 2015, and another promotional track from the album, titled "True Friends", was released on 24 August 2015. The album was released on 11 September 2015 to critical acclaim. It has led to several music videos including "Drown", "Throne", "True Friends", "Follow You", "Avalanche", and "Oh No".

The band embarked on a U.S. tour in October 2015 with support from metalcore band Issues and rock band PVRIS. The band also toured Europe in November 2015, and embarked on a second U.S. tour in April and May 2016. This was followed by  an Australian tour in September 2016, and a second European tour in November 2016.

On 22 April 2016, the band performed a live concert with an orchestra conducted by Simon Dobson at the Royal Albert Hall in London. The concert marked the first time the band had performed with a live orchestra. It was recorded, and the live album, Live at the Royal Albert Hall, was released on 2 December 2016 through the crowdfunding platform PledgeMusic on CD, DVD, and vinyl, with all proceeds donated to Teenage Cancer Trust.  Following the show, Fish hinted at the possibility of doing a full tour with an orchestra, saying: "It seems almost a bit of a shame to go to all this effort for months and months for just one night."

Amo (2018–2019)

In August 2018, cryptic posters appeared in major cities throughout the world with the message "do you wanna start a cult with me?". The posters were attributed by major media outlets to the band only by their use of the hexagram logo previously used by the band. During this time the band themselves have not acknowledged their involvement with the campaign publicly. Each poster provided a unique phone number and a website address. The website provided a brief message titled "An Invitation To Salvation" and shows the date of 21 August 2018. The phone lines placed fans on hold with lengthy, varied audio messages that changed frequently. Some of these messages reportedly end with a distorted audio clip of what was assumed to be new music from the band.

On 21 August, the band released the lead single "Mantra". The following day the band announced their album Amo, released on 11 January 2019, along with a set of tour dates called the First Love World Tour.

On 21 October, the band released their second single "Wonderful Life" featuring Dani Filth, along with the tracklist for Amo. That same day, the band announced that the album has been delayed and is now set for 25 January 2019.

On 1 December, it was reported that during a show at Ally Pally a fan died in the mosh pit and was escorted by paramedics and security. A day later, it was confirmed by the band with a statement: "Words cannot express how horrified we are feeling this evening after hearing about the death of a young man at our show last night. Our hearts and deepest condolences go out to his family and loved ones at this terrible time. We will comment further in due course."

On 3 January 2019, the band released their third single "Medicine" and its corresponding music video. On 22 January, three days before the album release, the band released the fourth single "Mother Tongue". On 24 January, the band released the fifth single "Nihilist Blues" featuring Grimes.

On 26 July, the band released the sixth single "Sugar Honey Ice & Tea" alongside an accompanying music video. On 21 October, the band released the seventh single "In the Dark" alongside an accompanying music video featuring Forest Whitaker. On 6 November, the band released the song "Ludens", which is part of Death Stranding: Timefall, along with the news that the band are planning on never releasing an album again and instead want to release EPs. On 27 December, the band released Music to Listen to~Dance to~Blaze to~Pray to~Feed to~Sleep to~Talk to~Grind to~Trip to~Breathe to~Help to~Hurt to~Scroll to~Roll to~Love to~Hate to~Learn Too~Plot to~Play to~Be to~Feel to~Breed to~Sweat to~Dream to~Hide to~Live to~Die to~Go To without any prior announcement.

Post Human: Survival Horror (2020–present)

On 20 March 2020, the band shared that they were in a home studio, writing and recording material for their eighth record, which is expected to be an EP, with part of it being co-produced by Mick Gordon. On 25 June, the band released the single "Parasite Eve" alongside an accompanying music video. On the same day, the band also announced a project that they have been working on titled Post Human, which they said to be four EPs released throughout the next year which when combined would make an album. On 2 September, the band released with English singer Yungblud a collaborative single titled "Obey" and its corresponding music video. On 14 October, the band officially announced through social media that Post Human: Survival Horror would be released on 30 October 2020. On 22 October, a week before the release date, the fourth single "Teardrops" was released alongside an accompanying music video.

In December 2020, Fish said that the band had been writing "on and off" and would be focusing on their next release in early 2021. He also updated the group's release plan, saying that they "planned to do four EPs in a year, but [Post Human: Survival Horror] was almost an album, so I think the spacing will be a bit longer than intended, just because they're probably going to turn out bigger than intended." Upon being released on physical formats on 22 January 2021, Post Human: Survival Horror would chart again and reach a new peak to gift Bring Me the Horizon their second UK number one on the UK Albums Chart. Two years after Amo would be the first to reach this feat. The band collaborated with singer Olivia O'Brien on a track titled "No More Friends". The song is from O'Brien's Episodes: Season 1' EP which was released on 11 June 2021.

On 2 September 2021, the band announced the release of an upcoming single, "Die4U", which was released on 16 September. On 8 December, the band was announced as the Saturday co-headliner alongside Arctic Monkeys at the 2022 iteration of the Reading and Leeds Festival, headlining the bill for the first time ever. Speaking to NME about the announcement, Sykes expressed his thoughts about headlining Reading and Leeds, as well as what to expect from their headline set:

In February 2022, it was reported that the band were set to contribute to the soundtrack and provide the main theme for Gran Turismo 7. On 4 February, the band released their rendition of "Moon Over the Castle" as a single ahead of schedule due to the song being leaked early. At the 42nd Brit Awards, the band were brought out as a surprise act to perform "Bad Habits" alongside Ed Sheeran. The studio version of "Bad Habits" featuring the band followed on 17 February. On 16 March, the band were featured on the fourth single "Maybe" from Machine Gun Kelly's Mainstream Sellout. It would become the first song by the band to reach the Billboard Hot 100, debuting at #91 and later peaked at #68. On 26 March, the band teased a collaborative single with Australian rapper Masked Wolf on their social media platforms titled "Fallout", slated for release on 1 April 2022. On 21 April, the band were featured on Norwegian singer Sigrid's single "Bad Life" from her album How to Let Go.

During Bring Me the Horizon's Malta event on 26 May, the band showcased their latest single "Strangers" for the first time at their DJ set. On 22 June, the band later officially announced the single to be released on 6 July. The single was then released alongside an accompanying music video. Bring Me the Horizon are set to headline the Australian music festival, Good Things in December.

Artistry

Style and influences
Among Bring Me the Horizon's earliest influences were bands like At the Gates, Carcass, Pantera, Metallica, The Dillinger Escape Plan, Every Time I Die, Norma Jean, Skycamefalling and Poison the Well; and genres death metal, grindcore, and emo have been cited by AllMusic writer Steward Mason. However, as their sound developed, the band started to take influences from progressive rock, post-rock, dubstep and electronica. The band's musical style has been described mainly as metalcore and – though they have since moved on from the genre – their early material was considered deathcore. Across their career the band has also been said to play within the genres alternative metal, alternative rock, pop rock, electronic rock, hard rock, heavy metal, post-hardcore, pop metal, pop, nu metal, electropop, hip hop, EDM, arena rock, melodic metalcore, electronicore, electronica, screamo, hardcore punk, technical metal, and emo.

Bring Me the Horizon have attempted to grow and change with each album, believing they should be different. Raziq Rauf, writing for Drowned in Sound, described Count Your Blessings as possessing "Norma Jean-style thunderous riffs mixed with some dastardly sludgy doom moments and more breakdowns than your dad's old Nissan Sunny." Metal Hammer described Suicide Season as a "creative, critical and commercial success" for the band as they started to adopt a more eclectic style, with its "crushingly heavy party deathcore". Leading up to its release, Oliver Sykes described it as "100% different to Count Your Blessings" and noted the album sounds "more rock than metal". As time went by, Bring Me the Horizon began rejecting their debut album Count Your Blessings and considered Suicide Season as their "Year Zero[...] [their] wipe-the-slate-clean time".

Bring Me the Horizon then moved even further away from deathcore with their third album There Is a Hell..., which incorporated electronica, classical music and pop music into their metalcore style. This required more ambitious production feats, such as using a full choir, a synthesised orchestra and glitched out vocals and breakdowns that were also toned down, favouring quiet atmospheric passages in song breaks. For the writing of Sempiternal, the band pooled far broader influences such as post-rock acts like This Will Destroy You and Explosions in the Sky and from pop music.

Bring Me the Horizon has experimented with its music in recent years, mixing pop with metal music, leading the band to be labelled a pop metal act. With the release of That's the Spirit, their sound shifted towards electronic rock, alternative metal and alternative rock, also incorporated other genres such as pop rock and nu metal, while completely abandoning the metalcore sound of their earlier albums.

Songwriting and recording process
In all the band's album notes, all of Bring Me the Horizon's lyrics are said to be written by lead vocalist Oliver Sykes while all five members—as a band—were credited with writing the music. With the exception of Count Your Blessings, the band has always written in a secluded location to avoid being distracted. Oliver Sykes' lyrics have a strong feeling of catharsis for him. He mainly draws from personal experience and has described the band's live performances as therapeutic. In 2006, when asked about the lyrics of Count Your Blessings, as they had been criticised for their content solely fixated on heartbreak and other themes that were called "shallow and meaningless", he responded "My life's never been that bad so I've not got that much to talk about."
Band members have described how the debut album was written in inner-city areas of Birmingham while being pressured to write and record songs to the deadlines given. This resulted in the band being unimpressed with the final product. However, for the writing process of Suicide Season, the band realised that they much preferred picking areas with less human contact in order to focus on the music; they wrote their second album in the Swedish countryside. During the writing of Suicide Season, former and founding rhythm guitarist Curtis Ward wrote only two riffs of his rhythm parts of the album, mostly relying on Lee Malia to write all of the guitar sections of the album.

Lee Malia has stated that the typical writing process involves Oliver Sykes writing the main structure of the songs, followed by Malia writing the main riff. From this they would collaborate with each other to structure their work better and then later include the rest of the band in writing the rest of the song. The writing dynamic of Sempiternal, typically featured Sykes, Malia and newly introduced member Jordan Fish. Malia felt that with Fish's influence on the record he was pushed to create more inspired guitar riffs. As they all took a break before writing their fourth album, they felt less of a need for an isolated writing environment.

Image and legacy

During the band's early years, they were praised for their business acumen for selling mail-order merchandise and not relying on sales at live shows. Bring Me the Horizon's image has been characterised by the dominating personality of singer and front-man Oliver Sykes, and he has often been seen as the band's "Poster boy", bearing the brunt of the band's controversial reputation. In their early years, Bring Me the Horizon's image was infamously characterised by its members fashion sense and use of skinny-fit jeans, T-shirts with death metal band logos on the front and coloured hair/straightened hair. The band's image fit into what was called scene fashion. The effect of their fashion aesthetics showed people, in show promoter Iain Scott's perspective, that "you don't have to look like a diabolical metalhead to be into metal or play in a metal band". However, their fashion conscious appearance earned them a "style over substance" label.

Many controversies that occurred in their early years greatly affected public perceptions of the band, particularly an incident in 2007 at Nottingham's Rock City venue, when a female fan claimed that Oliver Sykes had urinated on her. The charges were dropped due to a lack of evidence from CCTV footage in the area. There were several documented examples of violence against the band during their live shows, including Sykes being pepper sprayed on stage; and people getting onstage to assault the band.

Despite the controversy over their image, various journalists have credited the band as being one of the most forward-thinking heavy bands in the UK. In 2012, just four years after the release of Suicide Season, the album was inducted into Rock Sound's Hall of Fame, credited as a significant influence on the works of Asking Alexandria, The Ghost Inside and While She Sleeps. It was credited as an influence on metalcore contemporaries Architects on Hollow Crown with their incorporation of keyboards and programming, and The Devil Wears Prada's Dead Throne for its more experimental and opinion-dividing sound. In an interview with Kerrang!, guitarist Lee Malia remarked that the band wanted to go a bit more experimental, saying: "I always think we have been a year ahead of bands who are kind of just seeing what's cool and then copying it."

The band caused further controversy in February 2016 when Oliver Sykes trashed Coldplay's table at the 2016 NME Awards during a live performance of Bring Me the Horizon's track "Happy Song". Although some people thought the table trashing was because of a prior feud between the two bands relating to similar album artwork, Sykes later stated that the act was not an act of "dirty protest", and suggested that it was "pure coincidence" that Coldplay were sitting at the table he trampled. Coldplay frontman Chris Martin admitted that he had never even heard of Bring Me the Horizon before the incident and he laughed it off, stating that "it was great, very 'rock and roll'".

Band members

Current
 Oliver Sykes – lead vocals ; keyboards, programming 
 Matt Kean – bass 
 Lee Malia – lead guitar ; rhythm guitar 
 Matt Nicholls – drums 
 Jordan Fish – keyboards, programming, drum pads, percussion, backing vocals 

Current touring musicians
 John Jones – rhythm guitar, backing vocals 

Former
 Curtis Ward – rhythm guitar 
 Jona Weinhofen – rhythm guitar, keyboards, programming, backing vocals 

Former touring musicians
 Dean Rowbotham – rhythm guitar 
 Robin Urbino – rhythm guitar 
 Tim Hillier-Brook – rhythm guitar 
 Brendan MacDonald – rhythm guitar, backing vocals 

Timeline

Discography

 Count Your Blessings (2006)
 Suicide Season (2008)
 There Is a Hell Believe Me I've Seen It. There Is a Heaven Let's Keep It a Secret. (2010)
 Sempiternal (2013)
 That's the Spirit (2015)
 Amo (2019)

Awards and nominations
Grammy Awards

!
|-
| 2019 || "Mantra" || Best Rock Song || 
| 
|-
| 2020 || Amo || Best Rock Album || 
| 

BRIT Awards

!
|-
| 2020 || Bring Me the Horizon || Best Group || 
| 
|-

NME Awards!
|-
| rowspan="2"| 2017 || Bring Me the Horizon || Best Live Band || 
| 
|-
| Bring Me the Horizon || Music Moment of the Year || 
| 
|-
| 2020 || Bring Me the Horizon || Best Band in the World || 
| 
|-
| rowspan="2"| 2022 || Bring Me the Horizon || Best Band in the World || 
| 
|-
| Bring Me the Horizon || Best Live Act || 
| Kerrang! Awards!
|-
| 2006 || Bring Me the Horizon || Best British Newcomer || 
| 
|-
| 2008 || Bring Me the Horizon || Best British Band || 
| 
|-
| 2009 || Bring Me the Horizon || Best British Band || 
| 
|-
| rowspan="3"| 2011 || "Blessed with a Curse" || Best Single || 
| 
|-
| Bring Me the Horizon || Best British Band || 
| 
|-
| There Is a Hell Believe Me I've Seen It. There Is a Heaven Let's Keep It a Secret. || Best Album || 
| 
|-
| 2012 || "Alligator Blood" || Best Video || 
| 
|-
| rowspan="4"| 2013 || "Shadow Moses" || Best Single || 
| 
|-
| "Shadow Moses" || Best Video || 
| 
|-
| Sempiternal || Best Album || 
| 
|-
| Bring Me the Horizon || Best British Band || 
| 
|-
| rowspan="2"| 2014 || Bring Me the Horizon || Best Live Band || 
| 
|-
| Bring Me the Horizon || Best British Band || 
| 
|-
| rowspan="2"| 2015 || Bring Me the Horizon || Best British Band || 
| 
|-
| "Drown" || Best Single || 
| 
|-
| 2016 || Bring Me the Horizon || Best British Band || 
| 
|-
| rowspan="2"| 2019 || Amo || Best Album || 
| 
|-
| Bring Me the Horizon || Best British Act || 
| AIM Independent Music Awards!
|-
| rowspan="3"| 2011 || Bring Me the Horizon || Best Live Act || 
| 
|-
| Bring Me the Horizon || Hardest Working Band or Artist || 
| 
|-
| Bring Me the Horizon || Independent Breakthrough of Year || 
| Alternative Press

!
|-
| rowspan="2"| 2014 || Sempiternal || Best Album || 
| 
|-
| Bring Me the Horizon || Best International Band || 
| 
|-
| 2015 || "Drown" || Best Music Video || 
| 
|-

UK Music Video Awards

!
|-
| 2016
| "True Friends"
| Best Rock/Indie Video – UK
| 
| 

Heavy Music Awards

!
|-
| 2017
| Bring Me the Horizon
| Best UK Band
| 
| 
|-
| rowspan="2"| 2019
| Bring Me the Horizon
| Best UK Band
| 
| 
|-
| Bring Me the Horizon
| Best Live Band
| 
| 
|-
| rowspan="4"| 2020
| Bring Me the Horizon
| Best UK Band
| 
| 
|-
| Amo
| Best Album
| 
| 
|-
| Amo
| Best Album Artwork
| 
| 
|-
| "In the Dark"
| Best Video
| 
| 
|-
| rowspan="2"| 2021
| Post Human: Survival Horror
| Best Album
| 
| 
|-
| Bring Me the Horizon
| Best UK Band
| 
| 
|-
| rowspan="4"| 2022
| "Die4U"
| Best Single
| 
| 
|-
| Bring Me the Horizon
| Best Live Band
| 
| 
|-
| Bring Me the Horizon
| Best UK Band
| 
| 
|-
| "Die4U"
| Best Video
| 
| 

Readers polls
 In a 2009 Rock Sound readers' poll, Bring Me the Horizon achieved both Best British Band and Worst British Band.
 In 2011 The Guardian ran a poll for "Who should win the Mercury prize?" and used 50 albums, Bring Me the Horizon's third album There Is a Hell... won with 37%.
 In a 2013 Sirius XM published poll, Bring Me the Horizon won Best Song Discovery for "Go to Hell, for Heaven's Sake" with the Octane radio station.
 In a 2013 Alternative Press readers poll, Bring Me the Horizon was nominated for four categories: Best Vocalist (Oliver Sykes; position 3), Best Keyboardist (Jordan Fish; position 1), Single Of The Year ("Shadow Moses"; position 2) and "Best Album Art" (Sempiternal; position 2).
 In 2021, Kerrang! readers voted "Die4U" as the best song and music video of the year. Bring Me the Horizon was also voted as the best band and best live band of the year. They were also voted as the second-best cover story of the year by Kerrang Magazine.

Notes

References

Bibliography

External links

 
2004 establishments in England
British alternative metal musical groups
Columbia Records artists
English alternative rock groups
English deathcore musical groups
English metalcore musical groups
English pop rock music groups
Kerrang! Awards winners
Musical groups from Sheffield
Musical groups established in 2004
Musical quintets
RCA Records artists
Let Them Eat Vinyl artists